The 2003–04 Icelandic Hockey League season was the 13th season of the Icelandic Hockey League, the top level of ice hockey in Iceland. Three teams participated in the league, and Skautafelag Akureyrar won the championship.

Regular season

Final
 Skautafélag Akureyrar - Skautafélag Reykjavíkur 3:0 (5:2, 7:1, 6:1)

External links 
 2003-04 season

Icelandic Hockey League
Icelandic Hockey League seasons
2003–04 in Icelandic ice hockey